Henrik Harder (1642 – January 8, 1683) was a Danish Neolatin poet, who wrote epic poems and epigrams.

Life
He was born Henrik Harder in Flensburg. At the age of 10 his family moved to Copenhagen, where he eventually died at the age of 42. His father, Claus (Claudius), was a courtier of Frederick III, King of Denmark. Henrik himself spent a number of years in England as the secretary to Christopher Lindenov (1639–1697), the Danish envoy to England from 1668–1672. His service complete, he explored Europe for a time, and then returned to Copenhagen and became tutor to count Niels Friis (Nicolaus Frisius, 1665–1699). He is buried in St. Peter's Church in Copenhagen.

Works
1. An epic poem on the 1659 Assault on Copenhagen, Hafnia arctiori obsidione liberata (1660). It is reprinted in Rostgaard vol 2, pp. 305–346.
2. Panegyris Heroica in honorem Petri, Comitis a Griffenfeld (1675). It is reprinted in Rostgaard vol 2, pp. 347–364.
3. Canum cum cattis certamen, published under the pseudonym C. Catullus Caninius. It is reprinted (with explicit attribution to Harderus) in Rostgaard vol. 2, pp. 365–368.
4. Epigrammatum Libri Tres. Hafniae: Johannes Adolph, 1679. All three books are reprinted in Rostgaard vol 2, pp. 209–304. 
5. Twenty-six further epigrams on mythological themes, written to accompany Wilhelm Salsmann's illustrations of Ovid's Metamorphoses, were posthumously printed in Sommer 1758, pp. 170–176.

A Danish translation of 100 epigrams appeared in 1903.

References

Bibliography
 Dahl, Frederik (tr.) (1903). Henrik Harder: Et Hundrede Epigrammer: Udvalgte og oversatte fra Latin af Fredrik Dahl. Denmark: (n.p.).
 Johannes Moller, Cimbria literata sive scriptorum ducatus ut utriusque Slesvicensis et Holsatici historia literaria tripartita, Volume 1 (1744), p. 235.
 Rostgaard, F. (1693). Deliciae quorundam poëtarum danorum collectae et in II. tomos divisae. Netherlands: apud Jordanum Luchtmans. Vol. 2, pp. 209–368.
 Sommer, J. M. (1758). Miscellanea. Hafniae et Lipsiae: Pelt.

External links
Andreasen, Øjvind: Henrik Harder i Dansk Biografisk Leksikon på lex.dk. Retrieved 30 May 2021 from https://biografiskleksikon.lex.dk/Henrik_Harder

1642 births
1683 deaths
People from Flensburg
17th-century Danish poets